Schaafheim is a municipality in the Darmstadt-Dieburg district, in Hesse, Germany.

References

Darmstadt-Dieburg